Animal Mechanicals is a Canadian CGI animated television preschool series that was created by Jeff Rosen. Produced by Halifax Film, in association with the CBC and distributed by Decode Entertainment, the series premiered in Canada on CBC Television as part of the Kids' CBC in 2007. In the United States, it premiered on The Hub on October 11, 2010.

The French-Canadian version of Animal Mechanicals is indeed to be called; or retitled as; Les Super Mécanimaux; in fact in which also airs on the French-language free-to-air television network Ici Radio-Canada Télé; in which the French-Canadian voice actors Nicolas Charbonneaux-Collombet as Rex, Éveline Gélinas as Unicorn/Licorne, François Caffiaux as Komodo, Catherine Brunet as Mouse/Petite Souris, and Denis Roy as Sasquatch.

In 2019, the series was revived through the release of new nonverbal webshorts produced by WildBrain Spark Studios, a subsidiary of WildBrain that produces original content for the WildBrain Spark network. Alexander Toi provides the occasional vocal noises for the male characters, while the females are performed by Rea Riley.

Cast 
 Mouse – Abigail Gordon
 Unicorn – Leah Ostry
 Rex – Jim Fowler
 Sasquatch – Ian MacDougall
 Komodo – Shannon Lynch
 Island Owl – Lenore Zann

Main characters

Rex 
Rex is a green Mechana-tyrannosaurus. His enhanced ability is strength. Often, when utilizing this ability, Unicorn refers to him as being "strong like a titanium Tyrannosaurus" which, with his name and bipedal shape, would indicate that he is a robotic Tyrannosaurus rex. He is the leader of the Animal Mechanicals when they are on their journey to their mission. When he transforms, he becomes a cross between a truck, a forklift, a tractor, and a digger. He also has an obsession with food. He is voiced by Jim Fowler; and/or Nicolas Charbonneaux-Collombet in French Canadian.

Unicorn 
Unicorn is a pink Mechana-unicorn. Her ability is Mechana Fly, which is when she appears two wings on her back and her hooves turn into rocket boosters. The horn on her head can be made to blink like a beacon, allowing other creatures to follow her while she is flying. It can also do magic, make a whirlwind, throw lightning and light up. When flying, her legs are bent backwards and her hooves become rocket boosters, propelling her through the air. Her wings are folded inside her back, except when in use where they provide direction and speed control. She is the only Animal Mechanical who does not walk on two legs. She is voiced by Leah Ostry; and/or Éveline Gélinas in French Canadian.

Komodo 
Komodo is a red Mechana-Komodo dragon who walks on two legs and has big, squared-off blue glasses. His enhancement is the ability to change his tail into a selection of tools, such as a wrench, a saw, a hammer or a screwdriver. Often, when utilizing this ability, Unicorn refers to him as being "handy dandy tool time." This does, however, involve him working backwards to the line of the problem, forcing him to bend almost in half in order to see what he is doing. He is shown to be very smart, often figuring out the small details of the problem in hand. He tends to act like a martial arts expert. In a few episodes, he reveals that he has a sensitive stomach and legs. He often has to warn Sasquatch about "traps", and is the only Animal Mechanical to have more than one stock footage sequence. As a running gag for whenever he uses his powers, something random would be picked by mistake, including a rubber duck, a submarine sandwich, and a teddy bear among others. He is voiced by Shannon Lynch; and/or François Caffiaux in French Canadian.

Sasquatch 
Sasquatch is a blue Mechana-Bigfoot who has the enhanced ability to stretch. Each of his limbs extend to an incredible length. When stretched his arms and legs are long, however his joints do not alter and bend as usual. In the episode, "Baboon Balloon Island", it was stated that he is allergic to air pears and in this same episode and "Mechana Skee Ball Island", he has anxiety and a fear of heights. He has referred to himself several times as "the Mighty Sasquatch". Whenever Sasquatch is scared, Mouse always comes to hold his hand (as seen in "Jigsaw Shark Puzzle" and "Chugboat Island"), but whenever he's scared or impatient (as seen in "Dino Mountain Island" and "Snail's Pace Race"), Mouse always comes to hold his hand. Sasquatch often disrespects Komodo's warnings. He is voiced by Ian MacDougall; and/or Denis Roy in French Canadian.

Mouse 

Mouse is a yellow Mechana-mouse who is the youngest in the group and runs about on two pumps instead of her back feet. Her ability is Mechana-Fast, which is increased by lying flat, with her front paws on the ground, which also have wheels on them, and flattening her ears to the side of her head and extending exhaust pipes which help to propel her forwards. Her ears act like satellite dishes to catch sounds. For some reasons, she laughs and giggles before Sasquatch transforms and can fit to tight places her friends cannot. Whenever Sasquatch is afraid or impatient, she always come to hold his hand. But when she is scared, Sasquatch is always there to hold her hand. She also has the ability to understand creatures. She is voiced by Abigail Gordon; and/or Catherine Brunet in French Canadian.

Island Owl 
Island Owl is a red Mechana-owl and the team's commander that only appears at the beginning of each episode, giving the team's their mission. Her head resembles a television set, which began each briefly showing her face, then changes to show a representation of the island to which the Animal Mechanicals are to be sent. She does not accompany the Animal Mechanicals, after they have left to go on their mission as she is not heard from or seen again; however she is mentioned by Komodo whenever someone breaks a rule. She is voiced by Lenore Zann.

Episodes

Broadcast 
Animal Mechanicals is broadcast in Canada on CBC Television in the Kids' CBC programming block, weekdays at 7:30 am. It was also broadcast on Saturday mornings  on Playhouse Disney, later Disney Junior in the United Kingdom. In Latin America, it was broadcast in Discovery Kids and Discovery Familia on January 19, 2009 until early 2013, the digital cable channels owned by Discovery Networks, and Discovery, Inc., in a Spanish or Portuguese (in Brazil) dubbed version and are called Mecanimales (Spanish) or Mecanimais (Portuguese). It is dubbed in Irish on Cúla 4 ná nóg, the children's portion of TG4 in the Republic of Ireland. The series premiered in the United States on October 11, 2010 on The Hub. In Israel it was broadcast on Hop! Channel in 2011, in a Hebrew dubbed version. In Qatar it was broadcast on Baraem in the early 2010s, in an Arabic dubbed version.

References

External links 

 
 

2000s Canadian animated television series
2000s preschool education television series
2000s Canadian comic science fiction television series
2007 Canadian television series debuts
2010s Canadian animated television series
2010s preschool education television series
2010s Canadian comic science fiction television series
2011 Canadian television series endings
Animal superheroes
Animated preschool education television series
Animated television series about mammals
Canadian children's animated adventure television series
Canadian children's animated comic science fiction television series
Canadian children's animated science fantasy television series
Canadian children's animated superhero television series
Canadian computer-animated television series
Canadian preschool education television series
CBC Kids original programming
English-language television shows
Television series by DHX Media
Television shows filmed in Halifax, Nova Scotia
Television shows filmed in Toronto